This is a list of last scions (individuals who were the last member of a ruling house (dynasty), or other prominent family, where heredity is the prime form of inheritance). This may be the last person to rule a realm, sometimes leading to a political crisis, or a change in government; other times power has already passed from the patrilineal family, leaving it in a less important position when it reaches its extinction. Illegitimacy was rarely considered acceptable to be part of a dynasty, even if recognized by the parent.

Those who were the last scions, whether male or female, are identified in bold.

Last scions of ruling houses

References 

Nobility
Last scions